SeeFood (also known as Sea Level in the United States) is a Malaysian computer-animated adventure film produced by Silver Ant and released in Malaysian cinemas on 8 March 2012.

SeeFood was first launched in Poland on 7 October 2011. It received financial support from Malaysian Ministry of Science, Technology and Innovation and from the Multimedia Development Corporation.

The movie is also available in original and dubbed-in-Malay versions on Astro First.

Plot

In the ocean deeps, whitetip shark named Julius and his friend Pup the brownbanded bamboo shark play around the ocean bed, when two human divers steal several shark eggs (Pup siblings) from the reef, despite Pup's efforts to prevent it. To light up the Pup, Julius takes him to his sunken ship for dinner, but Pup is too upset to eat anything. Pup meets his friend Octo the octopus inventor, who takes Pup to show off his invention; an underwater car, and take it out for a test drive.

Meanwhile a factory, who is polluting the ocean prompts a hostile moray eel named Murray to invade the ocean bed with his army of deep sea crabs. The stingray Spin finds a discarded restaurant menu and takes it to Julius's three pilot fish butlers. The menu shows a variety of chicken meals, which are only found on land.

Spin and Myrtle the sea turtle lead Julius to a beach, where he is almost stranded, while trying to eat a hen named Heather, but makes it back into the sea. On his next hunt for fish, Julius is caught by a large fish hook and is reeled up on to a boat. He is almost finned alive by a group of fishermen, but escapes when a large wave hits the boat.

Pup sights his unhatched siblings on a wharf being moved into a fishmonger's shed, but Myrtle and Octo refuse to assist him in the dangerous task of rescuing them. Pup overhears them talking about his ability to breathe on land, then goes back to the wharf. Myrtle and Julius found out that from interrogating Spin that Pup is endangering himself, then they persuade Octo to help rescue Pup. Meanwhile, Pup has found the shark eggs in a fish shed, but has to hide from the fishmonger.

Octo constructs a robotic suit to allow Julius and his pilot fish take maneuver on land and uses a rocket to launch the suit on to the shore. However, Octo is not concerned that the suit may fall apart as an opportunity to be rid of Julius. The suit crashes into a chicken farm, where they are soon caught by the roosters and taken to the fish shed, where the fishmonger keeps them captive.

The shark eggs begin to hatch and Pup is able to get them out of the shed before the divers who caught them in the first place. Myrtle helps Pup the rest of the way. Hearing from his friends that Julius is in trouble, Pup sets off to rescue him, helped by a coconut crab and the roosters, who relented.

As Myrtle and Octo get the shark eggs and two newly hatched sharks to safety, the deep sea dwellers march on. Octo and Myrtle fight off the invaders, helped by Spin (who had collaborated with them previously). Realising that the factory pollution had prompted Murray to attack the ocean bed, Octo procures some old sea mines from his submarine. His friends help him carry the mines to block up the factory pipes depositing the pollution.

Pup, the roosters and the coconut crab, release Julius and his pilot fish. After a brief fight against the fishmonger and his two divers, the shed catches fire. The three humans pursue the escaping animals by dune buggy and motorcycles. As the chase ensues, the roosters get the two divers out of the way.

At the beach, the fishmonger momentarily catches Pup, but Julius rescues him and the fishmonger drives off the edge of a pier, his buggy crashing right into the sea mines and blowing up the factory. The fishmonger and his divers are arrested by the police for the caused damage.

Julius gets out of the suit, returns to the reef and drives away the invading deep sea dwellers. Totally out of danger, Pup and his friends raise the newly hatched sharks, while the roosters play around with Octo's suit until it breaks and sinks into the ocean.

Voice cast

 Gavin Yap as Julius, a whitetip shark
 Diong Chae Lian as Pup, a young brownbanded bamboo shark
 Christina Orow as Myrtle, an elderly green sea turtle
 Kennie Dowle as Octo, a mad scientist blue-ringed octopus
 Jason Daud Cottom as Larry, a pilot fish who is one of Julius's butlers
 Andrew Susay as Moe, a pilot fish who is another of Julius's butlers
 Brian Zimmerman as Curly, a pilot fish, also another of Julius's butlers
 Colin Chong as Lee, a rooster
 Adila Shahir (Dilly) as Heather, a hen
 Tikriti Shabudin as Spoch, a rooster
 Rob Middleton as Herc, a rooster
 Chi-Ren Choong as fishmonger
 Steven Tan as Lanky
 Maxwell Andrew as Pudgy
 Mike Swift as Murray, a moray eel who lives in the Deep sea
 Jay Sheldon as Spin, a southern stingray
 Ramona Rahman as Mrs. Chong
 Amelia Henderson as Ruby
 Ralph Guggeria as TV Announcer
 Toby Keith II as Seahorse

Production
SeeFood was jointly produced by Silver Ant Sdn Bhd and the Petaling Jaya-based independent studio Silver Ant and the children brand of the Al Jazeera channel (or JCC for short), with a grant from the Science, Technology and Innovation Ministry and also support from the Multimedia Development Corporation (MDeC).

Silver Ant has worked with MDeC previously, having been hired in 2005 to produce the trailer for Saladin: The Animated Series. The JCC producers, seeing the trailer for the series, loved it, and decided to take an interest into co-producing SeeFood.

Like the Pixar team behind Finding Nemo, SeeFood's animation team of 40 people put in much effort into studying the behaviour of the creatures that form the cast of SeeFood to be sure that they are portrayed in a realistic manner besides projecting a human expression that would bring them to life. The animation process took the team about two years.

Reception
The film received a mixed reception. Renee Schonfeld of Common Sense Media rated it with 1 star out of 5, citing it as a "Weak, poorly-plotted animated tale with scares, few laughs" and its environmental message "as random and murky as the story itself".

Film score and soundtrack

The film score was composed by Tan Yan Wei of Imaginex Studios. The movie did release any soundtrack, as Tan never died while in the making of the soundtracks of this film and Bunohan. The film scoring task was later taken over by Imaginex Studios.

Track listing

Box office

Awards

Kre8tif! Award

Anugerah Karyawan Animasi (Malaysia)

References

External links
 
 

Malaysian animated films
2011 computer-animated films
2011 films
English-language Malaysian films
2010s English-language films